The Montana Mountains are a mountain range in Humboldt County, Nevada. The mining company Lithium Americas Corporation is building a mine at Thacker Pass, which is between the Double H Mountains and the Montana Mountains.

References 

Mountain ranges of Humboldt County, Nevada
Mountain ranges of Nevada